Brico may refer to:

 Antonia Brico (1902-1989) Dutch musician
 Brico, Belgian hardware store
 Brico Dépôt, French hardware store
 Brico Centre (operating as "Brico"), former name of Canadian renovation centre chain Reno-Depot
 Brico Club, French TV series

See also

 
 
 
 BricoMarché, European hardware store
 Brico Cross, Low Countries cyclo-cross racing series
 Bricolage (disambiguation)
 Brick (disambiguation)
 Bric (disambiguation)